was a samurai of the Sengoku through early Edo periods. Born Sugihara Magobei (杉原孫兵衛), he later took the new family name Kinoshita ("under the tree"), possibly to show his support for his brother-in-law, the general who would become known as Toyotomi Hideyoshi.

At the time of the Battle of Sekigahara, Iesada was lord of Himeji han and held 25,000 koku of income. However, due to his distinction in guarding his sister O-ne (Hideyoshi's wife), Tokugawa Ieyasu rewarded him, and he was enfeifed at Ashimori han in Bitchu Province following the battle.

Iesada's children included Katsutoshi, Toshifusa, Nobutoshi, Toshisada, and Hideaki. Toshifusa, his second son, succeeded him.

Notes

References
 Nussbaum, Louis-Frédéric and Käthe Roth. (2005).  Japan encyclopedia. Cambridge: Harvard University Press. ;  OCLC 58053128

1543 births
1608 deaths
Daimyo
Samurai